Killens is a surname. Notable people with the surname include:

 John Oliver Killens (1916–1987), American author
 Marie Thérèse Killens (born 1927), Canadian politician
 Terry Killens (born 1974), American American football player

See also
 Killen (surname)